Combat is a video game by Atari, Inc. for the Atari Video Computer System (later renamed the Atari 2600). It was one of the nine launch titles for the VCS in September 1977 and was included in the box with the system from its introduction until 1982. Combat is based on two earlier black-and-white coin-operated arcade video games produced by Atari: Tank (published under the Kee Games name) in 1974 and Jet Fighter in 1975. Combat was programmed by Joe Decuir and Larry Wagner.

Earlier in 1977, Coleco had released the similarly titled Telstar Combat!, an entry in its Telstar series of dedicated consoles.  Unlike the Coleco game, Combat had color graphics and numerous gameplay variations.  The 27 game modes featured a variety of different combat scenarios, including tanks, biplanes, and jet fighters.  The tank games had options such as bouncing munitions ("Tank-Pong") and invisibility.  The biplane and jet games also allowed for variation, such as multiple planes per player and an inventive game with a squadron of planes versus one giant bomber.  Atari also produced a version of Combat for Sears titled Tank Plus (alluding to the original arcade game Tank).

Gameplay
Combat has 27 games modes, all of which are variations on the tank, biplane, and jet gameplay.

Tank game

In the "Tank" game of Combat, players control tanks and move around a playing field, shooting the other player until time runs out. The player with the higher score wins. Ammunition is dependent on the chosen level and includes straight missiles, guided missiles, and "Tank Pong," in which the shots bounce off the walls, with variations upon whether a direct hit can strike opponents or if a strike requires a billiard hit to count. There are also "Invisible Tank" and "Invisible Tank Pong" modes, in which the players are revealed only after firing. Along with the play styles, there are also mazes, including an empty field, a simple maze, and a complex maze.

Biplanes

Another set of level choices in Combat is "Biplanes". This was played with three types of ammunition (straight missiles, guided missiles, and machine guns), unlike the tank version. However, there were several different gameplay modes. Players have the option of fighting one-on-one, each flying a pair of biplanes that fire in sync, or one player controlling three synced biplanes against one large bomber. The bomber shoots an oversized projectile that otherwise behaves like a straight missile. Instead of mazes to fly through, there are two clouds in the middle of the stage that either player could fly into, temporarily hiding them from view.

Jet
The "Jets" option is similar to Biplanes, but uses only straight and guided missiles. It uses the same map and squadron options as the biplanes mode, with jets flying singly, in pairs, or in trios.

Reception
The cartridge and its individual games were reviewed in Video magazine as part of a general review of the Atari VCS. Collectively the "Tank" games (games 1–5) were praised for their sound effects and given a review score of 6 out of 10. The "Tank"/"Pong" games (games 6–9) were scored a 7.5 out of 10, the "Invisible Tank" games (games 10 and 11) were described as "hard to get used to but interesting" and were scored a 6.5 out of 10, and the "Invisible Tank"/"Pong" games (games 12–14) were scored a 7.5 out of 10. Both sets of "Bi-Plane" games (Normal – games 15–18, and Fast – games 19 and 20) were scored a 6 out of 10 each and were described as "not so different from the previous lot" (i.e. the "Tank" and "Pong" variations in games 1–14). The "Jet-Fighter" games (games 21–27) also received a collective score of 6 out of 10 and were described as "pretty much more of the same with different playing pieces". In 1995, Flux magazine ranked the game 48th on their Top 100 Video Games, they criticized the graphics yet they praised the gameplay as "100 pure adrenaline."

Legacy

Atari developed a sequel to Combat, originally announced in 1982, scheduled for release in 1984, but the video game crash of 1983 caused the game to be delayed and finally cancelled. While the game never hit store shelves, 250 copies of the prototype were produced in cartridge format and sold at Classic Gaming Expo in 2001.  Atari officially released it on the Atari Flashback 2 dedicated console, in 2005. It has seen two subsequent releases: a 2011 Nintendo DS compilation Atari's Greatest Hits Volume II and a 2012 iPhone and Android app Atari Greatest Hits.

Combat 2 is a more sophisticated version of the original's tank game, with tanks requiring multiple hits to destroy, and missile bases with an outer barrier that take many hits to chip through but the appropriate tank could hide within, and the ability to launch a large homing missile at very slow intervals. The game's action button fires the tank's gun normally but launches a missile if pressed while the tank is within the missile base. Destroying an opponent's missile base eliminates all of their reserve tanks. The game takes place in a forest environment divided by a river that can be crossed by either of two bridges. In some modes, the tanks can move under the trees and in others, the tanks are forced to go around or shoot their way through solid barriers. Some modes allow each player to detail the placement of trees or barriers prior to the battle.

A 3D remake, developed by Magic Lantern and published by Infogrames was released in 2001 for Windows.

Combat was made available on Microsoft's now-defunct Game Room service for its Xbox 360 console and for Microsoft Windows on March 24, 2010.

See also

List of Atari 2600 games

References

External links
Combat at Atari Mania
Combat at AtariAge
Combat Two at Atari Age

1977 video games
Atari 2600 games
Atari 2600-only games
Atari games
Pack-in video games
Tank simulation video games
Video games developed in the United States